Brnjica is a village situated in Knić municipality, Šumadija District in Serbia.

References

Populated places in Šumadija District